Giovanni Ferretti (born 15 January 1940 in Cremona; died 5 August 2007) was an Italian professional football player.

Honours
 Serie A champion: 1962/63.

References

1940 births
2007 deaths
Italian footballers
Serie A players
Serie B players
A.C. Reggiana 1919 players
Inter Milan players
Modena F.C. players
Palermo F.C. players
S.S. Arezzo players
Association football goalkeepers
Sportspeople from Cremona
Footballers from Lombardy